Datuk Md Sirat bin Abu (born 11 April 1959) is a Malaysian politician and a former Member of the Parliament of Malaysia for the Bukit Katil constituency in the state of Melaka. He is a member of the United Malays National Organisation (UMNO) party in the governing Barisan Nasional coalition.

Md Sirat was elected to federal Parliament in the 2008 election, having been nominated by UMNO to contest the seat ahead of its incumbent member Ruddin Ab Ghani. He had earlier served as President of the Melaka Municipal Council and political secretary to the Chief Minister of Melaka, Mohd Ali Rustam. He was dropped from UMNO's list of candidates for the 2013 Malaysian general election in favour of Mohd Ali, who was seeking to move to the federal parliament. Mohd Ali's move failed when the seat fell to the People's Justice Party's Shamsul Iskandar Md. Akin.

Election results

Honours
 :
 Officer of the Order of the Defender of the Realm (KMN) (2006)
 :
 Companion Class I of the Exalted Order of Malacca (DMSM) – Datuk (2002)

References

Living people
1959 births
People from Malacca
Members of the Dewan Rakyat
United Malays National Organisation politicians
Malaysian people of Malay descent
Malaysian Muslims
Officers of the Order of the Defender of the Realm